Bass Reeves (July 1838 – January 12, 1910) was an American law enforcement official, historically noted as the first black deputy U.S. marshal west of the Mississippi River. He worked mostly in Arkansas and the Oklahoma Territory. During his long career, he had on his record more than 3,000 arrests of dangerous fugitives, and shot and killed 14 of them in self-defense.

Early life
Reeves was born into slavery in Crawford County, Arkansas, in 1838. He was named after his grandfather, Bass Washington. Reeves and his family were owned by Arkansas state legislator William Steele Reeves. When Bass was eight (about 1846), William Reeves moved to Grayson County, Texas, near Sherman in the Peters Colony. It appears plausible that Reeves was kept in bondage by William Steele Reeves's son, Colonel George R. Reeves --  a Texan sheriff, legislator, and one-time Speaker of the Texas House of Representatives until his death from rabies in 1882.

When the American Civil War began, George Reeves joined the Confederate Army, forcing Bass to go with him. It is unclear how, and exactly when, Bass Reeves escaped, but at some point during the Civil War, he gained his freedom.  One account recalls how Bass Reeves and George Reeves had an altercation over a card game. Bass severely beat George, and fled to the Indian Territory where he lived among the Cherokee, Creeks and Seminoles. Bass stayed with these Native American tribes and learned their languages until he was freed by the Thirteenth Amendment's abolishment of slavery in 1865.

As a freedman, Reeves moved to Arkansas and farmed near Van Buren.

Career

Reeves and his family farmed until 1875 when Isaac Parker was appointed federal judge for the Indian Territory. Parker appointed James F. Fagan as U.S. marshal, directing him to hire 200 deputy U.S. marshals. Fagan had heard about Reeves, who knew the Territory and could speak several Native languages. He recruited him as a deputy; Reeves was the first black deputy to serve west of the Mississippi River. Reeves was assigned as a deputy U.S. marshal for the Western District of Arkansas, which had responsibility also for the Native reservation Territory. He served there until 1893. That year he transferred to the Eastern District of Texas in Paris, Texas, for a short while. In 1897, he was transferred again, serving at the Muskogee Federal Court in the Native Territory.

Reeves worked for 32 years as a federal peace officer in the Indian Territory and became one of Judge Parker's most valued deputies. Reeves brought in some of the most dangerous fugitives of the time; he was never wounded despite having his hat and belt shot off on separate occasions.

In addition to being a marksman with a rifle and revolver, Reeves developed superior detective skills during his long career. When he retired in 1907, Reeves had on his record over 3,000 arrests of felons. He killed 14 outlaws to defend his life. Reeves had to arrest his own son for murder; Benjamin "Bennie" Reeves was charged with the murder of his own wife. Despite being disturbed and deeply shaken by the incident, Reeves nonetheless insisted on the responsibility of bringing Bennie to justice. Bennie was subsequently captured, tried, and convicted. He served 11 years at Fort Leavenworth in Kansas before his sentence was commuted; he reportedly lived the rest of his life as a model citizen.

When Oklahoma became a state in 1907, Reeves, then 68, became an officer of the Muskogee Police Department. He served for two years before he became ill and retired.

Later years and death

Reeves was himself once charged with murdering a posse cook. At his trial before Judge Parker, Reeves claimed to have shot the man by mistake while cleaning his gun; he was represented by former United States Attorney W. H. H. Clayton, who was a colleague and friend.  Reeves was eventually believed and acquitted, possibly based on his exceptional record.

Reeves' health began to fail further after retiring. He died of Bright's disease (nephritis) on January 12, 1910.

Family and descendants 
Reeves was married twice and had eleven children. In 1864 he married Nellie Jennie (d. 1896) and after her death Winnie Sumter (1900–1910). His children were named Newland, Benjamin, George, Lula, Robert, Sally, Edgar, Bass Jr., Harriet, Homer and Alice.

He was a great-uncle of Paul L. Brady, who became the first black man appointed as a federal administrative law judge in 1972.

His great-great-grandson is former National Football League and Canadian Football League player Willard Reaves, while his great-great-great-grandsons are National Hockey League player Ryan Reaves and CFL player Jordan Reaves. Ryan Reaves's grandfather changed the family name from Reeves to Reaves.

Legacy

 Historian Art Burton has said that Reeves was the inspiration for the character of the Lone Ranger. Burton makes this argument based on the sheer number of people Reeves arrested without taking any serious injury, coupled with the fact that many of these arrested were incarcerated in the Detroit House of Correction, the same city where the Lone Ranger radio plays were broadcast on WXYZ. This theory is disputed.
 In 2011, the US-62 Bridge, which spans the Arkansas River between Muskogee and Fort Gibson, Oklahoma, was renamed the Bass Reeves Memorial Bridge.
 In May 2012, a bronze statue of Reeves by Oklahoma sculptor Harold Holden was erected in Pendergraft Park in Fort Smith, Arkansas.
 In 2013, he was inducted into the Texas Trail of Fame.

Television
 Reeves is the subject of the season two episode four of Gunslingers, "The real lone ranger".
 Reeves figures prominently in an episode of How It's Made, in which a Bass Reeves limited-edition collectors' figurine is shown in various stages of the production process.
 In "The Murder of Jesse James", an episode of the television series Timeless (season one, episode 12), Reeves is portrayed by Colman Domingo.
 Reeves was a featured subject of the Drunk History episode "Oklahoma" in which he was portrayed by Jaleel White.
 In "Everybody Knows", a season two episode of the television series Wynonna Earp, Reeves is portrayed by Adrian Holmes.
 Reeves is mentioned in the plot of "The Royal Family", a season two episode of the television series Greenleaf. Reeves' name is used as an alias by pastor Basie Skanks to support his church with gambling earnings.
 Reeves' status as one of the first black sheriffs plays a significant role as a childhood role model for the character of Will Reeves in the Watchmen television series. Reeves is portrayed by Jamal Akakpo in three episodes featuring a fictional 1920s silent film based on Reeves' exploits titled "Trust in the Law".
 Reeves is mentioned in season 3 episode 2 of the television series Justified as two US Marshals are discussing their all-time favorite historical US Marshals.
 Reeves features in the "Stressed Western" episode of Legends of Tomorrow, portrayed by David Ramsey. Ramsey is noted for having played Green Arrow's ally and confidant John Diggle in the Arrowverse since its inception. In context, Reeves is portrayed as Diggle's ancestor where Sara Lance called him "Dig" at one point even though he thought they were digging the gunfight activities. The Legends encounter him at Fist City, Oklahoma at the time when they were pursuing the Haverack, a rage-attracted alien worm that has been excreting gold. After the Haverack was slain by Astra Logue, Reeves brought Fist City back in order.
 Reeves features as a character played by Gary Beadle in Around the World in 80 Days.
 Bass Reeves, a limited series created by Taylor Sheridan and starring David Oyelowo, was announced by Paramount+ in September 2021 and will be an installment in the Yellowstone franchise.
 A miniseries based on Burton's 2006 biography (and co-produced by Morgan Freeman) was reported to be under development by HBO in 2015. The concept was later acquired by Amazon Studios in 2019, and ordered to series in 2022 under the title Twin Territories.
 In Season 34, episode 14 of The Simpsons, "Carl Carlson Rides Again," the character Lenny states that the TV show "The Lone Ranger" is based on Reeves.

Film
 In They Die by Dawn (2013), Reeves is portrayed by Harry Lennix.
 Hell on the Border is a 2019 action film based on the early law enforcement career of Reeves, starring David Gyasi. It was written and directed by Wes Miller and features Ron Perlman in a supporting role.
 In April 2018, Amazon Studios was reported to be developing a biopic of Reeves with the script and direction helmed by Chloé Zhao. No subsequent announcement was made about the fate of the project.

Reeves is portrayed by Delroy Lindo in The Harder They Fall (2021).

Reeves is portrayed by Isaiah Washington in the independent film Corsicana.

Theatre
 A stage play about Reeves entitled Cowboy, written and directed by Layon Gray, debuted  in 2019 at the  National Black Theatre Festival. It opened Off-Broadway in December of 2022 and is playing through December 2023 at The Actors' Temple West 47th St in Manhattan.

Games
 Reeves is a character in the miniature wargame Wild West Exodus.
 Reeves is a playable character in the board game Western Legends.
 In the card game Cartaventura Oklahoma, one plays the fictional escape of Bass Reeves with five possible outcomes. The game also includes an insert with a summary of Bass Reeves' story.

Comic books
 Darko Macan, Igor Kordey: Marshal Bass (8 books), Delcourt

Hall of fame
In 1992, he was inducted into the Hall of Great Westerners of the National Cowboy & Western Heritage Museum.

Literature

 Republished in 2022:

Notes

References

Further reading
 Art T. Burton, Black Gun, Silver Star: The Life and Legend of Frontier Marshal Bass Reeves, University of Nebraska Press, 2006.

External links

 Bass Reeves at Encyclopedia of Arkansas History & Culture
 Bass Reeves at Oklahoma Historical Society Encyclopedia of Oklahoma Culture and History
 Bass Reeves at Handbook of Texas Online

1838 births
1910 deaths
19th-century American slaves
African Americans in law enforcement
African Americans in the American Old West
American rebel slaves
American frontier
Cowboys
Deaths from nephritis
Gunslingers of the American Old West
Lawmen of the American Old West
Lone Ranger
People from Crawford County, Arkansas
People from Muskogee, Oklahoma
People from Paris, Texas
United States Marshals